Marika Vaarik (since 1994 Marika Vaarik-Soo; born on 13 October 1962 in Kose) is an Estonian actress.

In 1991 she graduated Tallinn Pedagogical Institute in theatrical directing speciality. 1987-1994 she worked at VAT Theatre, being also one of its founders. 1994-2005 she worked at Rakvere Theatre. Since 2009 she worked at NO99 Theatre. Besides theatrical roles she has also played on several films and television series. Vaarik is married to Mart Soo, composer, music teacher and guitarist of the ensemble Weekend Guitar Trio.

Awards:
 1999: Suur Vanker
 2013: Order of the White Star, IV class.

Selected filmography

 2003 Vanad ja kobedad saavad jalad alla (role: Linda)
 2005 Shop of Dreams (role: Silvia)
 2006 Georg (television film; role: Accompanyist Aime)  
 2007 Georg (feature film; role: Old Asta Ots' voice)
 2008: Tuulepealne maa (role: Asta Thal-Sammal)
 2008 Taarka (role: Vasso's mother)
 2009-2013 Kättemaksukontor (role: Frida Arrak)
 2010 Kutsar koputab kolm korda (role: Marju)
 2013 Elavad pildid (role: Roosi)
 2013 Mägede varjud (role: Maria)
 2016 The Days That Confused (role: Principal)
 2018 Take It or Leave It (role: Judge)
 2019 Truth and Justice (role: Madis' wife)

References

Living people
1962 births
Estonian stage actresses
Estonian film actresses
Estonian television actresses
Estonian theatre directors
20th-century Estonian actresses
21st-century Estonian actresses
Recipients of the Order of the White Star, 4th Class
Tallinn University alumni
People from Kose Parish